Billy Ervin McCormack (August 4, 1928 – May 31, 2012) was a Southern Baptist clergyman from Shreveport, Louisiana, active for more than sixty years in the ministry. Considered a leader of the "Religious Right", McCormack was one of the four national directors of the Christian Coalition of America, an organization assembled in 1989 by televangelist Pat Robertson.

From 1981 until his death, McCormack was the senior pastor of the University Worship Center, or University Baptist Church, at 9000 East Kings Highway in Shreveport. Previously, McCormack was the pastor of three other area congregations. He was the founder and headmaster of Trinity Heights Christian Academy and University Christian Prep School, both at 4800 Old Morringsport Road, and the University Montessori School at the East Kings Highway location.

Background
McCormack was born in Bienville Parish, to Charles T. "Charlie" McCormack (1904–1981) and Ida Mae McCormack (1908–1999), some two years before the outbreak of the Great Depression. McCormack describes his upbringing and resulting political philosophy, accordingly:

In 1952, McCormack graduated with a bachelor's degree from Northwestern State University in Natchitoches, Louisiana. He also received a master's degree from NSU and a Ph.D. from National Christian University, which operated in Arlington, Texas, between 1967 and 1975.

Christian ministry
In 1987, McCormack was named the Louisiana state coordinator of the "Americans for Robertson" presidential campaign. Pat Robertson's weak showing in the 1988 Republican presidential primaries resulted in the nomination and election of Vice President George Herbert Walker Bush to the presidency. The closing of Jerry Falwell's Moral Majority and the fallout from scandals involving several nationally known televangelists, such as Jim Bakker and Jimmy Swaggart, led the Religious Right to shift its concentration away from national politics to activities in local communities. McCormack urged Robertson to found the Christian Coalition. Robertson agreed and hired the young historian Ralph E. Reed, Jr., as the first executive director of the organization. McCormack was the director of the Pastor's Council of the Christian Coalition and the southern regional director of the Freedom Council, which Robertson established in an effort to recruit Christians into politics and government.

In addition to "director", McCormack held the title "vice president" of the Christian Coalition. The other directors were Robertson, his son Gordon P. Robertson, and Dick Weinhold of the Texas organization. The McCormack-led Robertson forces and other conservative allies in 1988 gained control of the Louisiana Republican State Central Committee. They blocked efforts to denounce David Duke, who from 1989 to 1992 was a Republican member of the Louisiana House of Representatives. Duke subsequently waged losing campaigns for U.S. Senator and governor in 1990 and 1991, respectively. Claims surfaced that Duke sold from his House office copies of such works as Adolf Hitler's Mein Kampf.

In 1989, the national GOP, led by former President Ronald W. Reagan and the first President Bush, repudiated Duke, who narrowly won a special election for the state House; it was not until November 1990 that Robertson publicly urged McCormack to "examine" Duke's record. McCormack stopped short of a public endorsement of Duke in the 1991 gubernatorial showdown with Edwin Edwards; Duke still received 69 percent of the white evangelical vote. McCormack was seated beside President Bush at a Conservative Coalition gathering in September 1992 at Robertson's walled estate in Virginia Beach, Virginia.

In early August 1994, McCormack invited Bill Horn and Peter LaBarbera, two opponents of homosexual rights, to Shreveport to make a presentation.  Horn produced the video "The Gay Agenda"; La Barbera edited the newsletter the Lambda Report. After this meeting, the University Baptist Church burned to the ground. Though arson had been first suspected, authorities determined that the facility had instead been struck by lightning.

In the 1950s, along with the staunchly segregationist newspaper publisher Ned Touchstone of Bossier City, McCormack had been an aide to Democratic U.S. Representative Overton Brooks, for whom the Veterans Administration Hospital in Shreveport is named. In time, however, McCormack endorsed civil rights for racial minorities. He served on Shreveport's Human Relations Commission, the Black History Committee, and the Martin Luther King Birthday Committee. For two years, he chaired the Human Rights Conference.

In 2000, McCormack represented the Christian Coalition at the Million Family March held on the fifth anniversary of the Million Man March, organized in 1995 in Washington, D.C., by the Reverend Louis Farrakhan of the Nation of Islam. Joining McCormack on the stage was the Reverend Sun Myung Moon of the Unification Church of South Korea. McCormack said that prior to 2000 he had earlier been misinformed about Farrakhan:

but when I heard that Minister Farrakhan had called for an agenda of love and reconciliation of the races, I knew I had to come and express my gratitude ... He is the one man that has the ear of so many people in America ... The Christian Coalition [has] been stereotyped quite well through the media as someone that's not acting in all peoples' best interest, but my being here is an indication that we stand for the rights of all people ... to work together and love one another for the Kingdom of God ...

In 2008, still involved with the Religious Right, McCormack joined other ministers in the endorsement of former Governor Mike Huckabee of Arkansas for the Republican presidential nomination, which was ultimately taken by U.S. Senator John McCain of Arizona. In his support for Huckabee, McCormack described the Arkansan as "not only well equipped for the presidency, he has demonstrated godly and righteous leadership in government ... He will unify evangelicals nationwide ... He is America's logical choice."

McCormack preached against alcohol abuse, which he called "the one social problem that stands beyond all the others". He elaborates:

Death
McCormack died in Shreveport at the age of eighty-three. He was preceded in death by his first wife, the former Carolyn Tomme (1933–2005), a native of Ringgold in Bienville Parish, and a brother, Dr. Jack McCormack. His second wife is the former Barbara Talley, who was a widow in Arkansas at the time of their marriage in 2006. The couple met on-line, found immediate compatibility, and married in an Arkansas courthouse as soon as they met.

From his first marriage, McCormack had three children: Victoria Lynn Williams and her husband, Charles William Williams; Patricia Jane McCormack Reeves, and William Michael McCormack and his wife, Cynthia. Services were held at the University Worship Center; officiating was Dr. Carlos G. Spaht, II, the older son of Carlos Spaht, a judge from Baton Rouge who ran unsuccessfully for governor in 1952. He is interred at Providence Cemetery in Ringgold.

Daniel Eugene "Dan" Perkins (born 1953), a Christian Coalition member and a Republican state senatorial candidate in 1999 against the late Ron Bean of Shreveport, was a pallbearer at McCormack's funeral. Of McCormack, Perkins said: "Though he influenced thousands worldwide, Pastor McCormack would cancel his plans and return home every time a member of his congregation was in need. That repeated  displayed his true heart and "calling" as a pastor above all else...."

References

1928 births
2012 deaths
People from Bienville Parish, Louisiana
People from Shreveport, Louisiana
20th-century Baptist ministers from the United States
21st-century Baptist ministers from the United States
American school principals
Christian fundamentalism
American anti-abortion activists
American temperance activists
Activists for African-American civil rights
Northwestern State University alumni
Louisiana Republicans
Baptists from Louisiana